Cheung Chau Public Pier is a public pier in Cheung Chau, New Territories, Hong Kong, located in Praya Street, with Cheung Chau Ferry Pier located between it and the Cheung Chau Typhoon Shelter. It is used for loading and unloading of goods, and running kai-to operation between other islands. The pier was built in 1950s. In 2002, the government decided to reconstruct the pier due to long-time deterioration of the pier. The reconstruction work was completed in 2005. On 8 August 2015, the first ferry route operated by Maris Ferry started running between this pier and Aberdeen Promenade.

References

Buildings and structures completed in 2005
Piers in Hong Kong
Cheung Chau